BC Cancer is part of the Provincial Health Services Authority in British Columbia, Canada.

Facilities 
BC Cancer's first cancer treatment centre (then known as the British Columbia Cancer Institute) officially opened in Vancouver on November 5, 1938.

BC Cancer operates six regional cancer centres (in Abbotsford, Kelowna, Prince George, Surrey, Vancouver and Victoria) and the BC Cancer Research Centre, with departments in Vancouver and in Victoria.

All radiotherapy services in British Columbia are provided by the BC Cancer, as well as a majority of chemotherapy services. BC Cancer works with local health authorities across the province to provide cancer clinics in areas remote from the six main cancer centres, to cover rural British Columbia and the Yukon.

Projects 
In 2000, the agency partnered with the Fred Hutchinson Cancer Research Center to create the Chinese Women's Health Project that provides culturally competent outreach programs to increase cervical cancer screening rates among this population.

Fundraising 
The BC Cancer Foundation is the fundraising partner of BC Cancer.

Established in 1938, the BC Cancer Foundation is an independent charitable organization that raises funds to advance research innovation and accelerate access to world-class care for all residents of the province of British Columbia.

All donations to the BC Cancer Foundation stay in British Columbia to make a direct impact on residents in every corner of the province. Some of the achievements include: discovering and deploying the first effective prevention strategy for ovarian cancer, being the first cancer centre to effectively treat a patient based on the DNA of their cancer, and launching Canada’s first province-wide lung cancer screening program.

Events 
The BC Cancer Foundation is the beneficiary of major fundraising events including: The Workout to Conquer Cancer, a 31-day challenge to move every day in May while fundraising and The Tour de Cure (formerly Ride to Conquer Cancer), presented by Wheaton Precious Metals, B.C.’s largest cycling fundraiser.

The Foundation has offices in six of BC Cancer's regional centres: Abbotsford, Surrey, Kelowna, Victoria, Vancouver and Prince George.

References

External links
 BC Cancer website
 About the BC Cancer Foundation, an independent charitable organization that supports research and care at BC Cancer

Cancer organizations based in Canada
Medical and health organizations based in British Columbia
1938 establishments in British Columbia